Tennessee Waltz, also known as Tennessee Nights, is a 1989 American thriller film directed by Nicolas Gessner and starring Julian Sands, Stacey Dash, and Ed Lauter. It was adapted for the screen by Laird Koenig from the 1984 novel Minnie oder Ein Fall von Geringfügigkeit ("Minnie, or a Case of Insignificance") by Hans Werner Kettenbach.

Premise
A British lawyer on holiday in Tennessee is blamed for a murder.

Cast
 Julian Sands as Wolfgang Leighton
 Stacey Dash as Minnie
 Ed Lauter as Sheriff Williams
 Ned Beatty as Charlie Kiefer
 Denise Crosby as Sally Lomas
 Brian McNamara as Hewitt
 Rod Steiger as Judge Prescott
 Wallace Wilkinson as Record Producer
 Johnny Cash as himself
 David Hess as Hank 
 Gary Grubbs as District Attorney

References

External links
 

1989 films
1980s thriller drama films
American thriller drama films
Swiss thriller drama films
German thriller drama films
West German films
English-language German films
English-language Swiss films
Films directed by Nicolas Gessner
Films set in Tennessee
Films based on German novels
Films scored by Gabriel Yared
1989 drama films
1980s English-language films
1980s American films
1980s German films